Inorbit Mall is a subsidiary of K. Raheja Corporation which runs shopping malls in various parts of India. The first Inorbit Mall opened in 2004, in Malad, Mumbai. This is the fourth oldest shopping mall in Mumbai, from Infiniti Mall of Andheri, R Mall of Mulund, and Crossroads of South Mumbai. Inorbit Malls launched their second property in Vashi, Navi Mumbai, in October 2008; third in Cyberabad, Hyderabad in October 2009; fourth in Vadgaon Sheri, Pune in May 2011 which was closed down in November 2016;  fifth in Whitefield, Bangalore on 15 September 2012 and sixth in Vadodara on 5 September 2013.

The company follows a lease-plus-revenue mode revenue model for all its properties.

Inorbit Malad
Inorbit Mall, Malad was the first shopping mall to open under the Inorbit umbrella. The mall was launched in 2004 in Malad, Mumbai. It is also the fourth oldest shopping mall in Mumbai. It was designed by architectural firm P.G. Patki and Associates and is counted among the better planned malls in the city. At the time, it claimed to be the biggest mall property in South East Asia, housing Mumbai's largest food court. In 2008, the mall was retrofitted for energy efficiency by Johnson Controls Inc under the Clinton Climate Initiative (CCI). The property was part of a civil suit, filed in 2008 by industrialist Nusli Wadia, owner of the land which was leased to K Raheja Corporation claiming damages for violation of the said lease. Wadia requested the court to direct the mall be demolished. In 2012, the Bombay High Court recommended that both parties appoint a third party valuer for the property and that the valuation be conducted every six months to calculate the 12% of the realisation figure that Wadia is entitled.

The mall houses 26 restaurants and the foodcourt is spread over 12,000 sq. ft and seats 800 people at a time. The restaurants at Inorbit Malad are sought after and waiting times are as long as three hours for a table. After the Inorbit Malad experience, the company has doubled the number of restaurants in subsequently developed mall spaces. Due to the number of footfalls, the mall hosts a variety of promotional events. In 2007, Panasonic displayed the world's largest plasma screen at Malad. Inorbit Malad frequently hosts Music releases of top bollywood movies. Movies which have had their music launched at the mall include The Dirty Picture and Don. Other bollywood events held at Inorbit Malad include pre-film promotional events attended by filmstars, like one attended by Asin to promote Ready and fashion brand Provogue as well as a launch by socialite Paris Hilton in 2011. Other events that have taken place at Inorbit Malad include an international boxing bout held by World Series of Boxing (WSB) in 2011. It is the first mall in the world to have held such an event. During large sports events such as the Indian Premier League, Inorbit installs large screens in food courts to retain clientele. The mall is said to generate revenues of between 800 million and 840 million per annum and attracts 40,000 visitors each weekend.

In 2010, Inorbit Malad launched "Mall Walk", a scheme where people could use the mall property for their morning walks at no cost. The development of Inorbit Mall has led to street hawkers setting up shop on the opposite side of the road, which was earlier a hawker-free zone. These hawkers synchronise their timings with that of the mall, with mall employees and customers being their clientele. The mall often plays host to cooking classes, self-defence workshops and free music concerts. Post 2017–present, one of the recently added popular stores of the mall is the H&M store which provides fashion wear for kids and adults.

Inorbit Vashi
Inorbit Vashi was inaugurated in 2008. The mall is located in Vashi, Navi Mumbai. The mall is credited with changing the face of the area, as until then there were no big brands having a presence in Vashi. Residents of neighbouring areas have voiced their wishes for an Inorbit Vashi type of mall to be built in their area as well. The mall is known as a "one stop destination" for shoppers in Navi Mumbai as well as for offering wifi facility at no cost to shoppers. The mall frequently hosts music events called "Live @ Inorbit" and has hosted bands such as The Yagna, Split, Live saver, Chain reaction and Inertia. In 2010, the mall ran an initiative called Aikya where it displayed a sand sculpture of a rhinoceros to promote wildlife conservation. As of July 2014, the mall offers many places to eat - Pot Pourri, Kareem's, Lemon Grass, Soy Street, KFC, Garden Court Restaurant, Starbucks and The Bowl House are a few of the restaurants at Inorbit mall vashi. There are many other brands related to skin care, salon and spa that have added to the buzz with the commencement such as Bodhi Thai Spa, Kaya Skin Clinic, Juice and Envi Salon.

This mall offers a wide variety of clothing options. There are many clothing brand stores such as Shoppers Stop, Westside, Allen Solly, BIBA, Gini & Jony Arrow, FabIndia, Globus, Jack & Jones, Max, Pepe Jeans etc.

Inorbit Pune
Inorbit Pune was opened in 2011 in Vadgaon Sheri, Pune. It has a gross leasable area of 547,000 square feet. In May 2011, Faces Cosmetics opened its first store in India at Inorbit Pune and in July 2011, Cinemax launched a four screen multiplex at the mall. In 2012, the Essel Group chose Inorbit Pune to launch the first outlet of EsselWorld Freeze. The mall was permanently closed in November 2016, except the PVR Multiplex.

Inorbit Cyberabad

Inorbit Cyberabad (Hyderabad) has a gross leasable area of 800,000 square feet. It was launched in 2009 and is also the biggest of all the Inorbit malls. It is located at Mindspace, Madhapur in Hitech City, Hyderabad.

Inorbit Whitefield
Inorbit Whitefield has a gross leasable area of 339,000 square feet. The mall was opened in 2012. It is located in Whitefield, Bengaluru.This mall has been closed in 2021

Inorbit Vadodara
Inorbit Vadodara has a gross leasable area of 474,000 square feet. The mall was inaugurated in 2013. It is located on Bhailal Amin Marg (Alembic Road) in Gorwa, Vadodara.

Future plans
Inorbit has planned an expansion of the malls in other cities. In 2011, it was reported that Inorbit was interested in buying under-construction malls in Delhi and Kochi to expand its business. In July 2022, it was announced that Raheja Group will open Inorbit Mall in Visakhapatnam near Saligramapuram.

References

Shopping malls in Mumbai
Shopping malls in Hyderabad, India
Shopping malls established in 2004
Postmodern architecture in India
2004 establishments in India